Josephine Holt Perfect Bay was an American financier and businessperson. She notably became the first woman to head a constituent firm of the New York Stock Exchange.

Biography 
Josephine Perfect Bay (née Perfect) was born in Iowa in 1900, the daughter of a real estate broker. Her family moved to Brooklyn when she was young, and she was educated at Brooklyn Heights Seminary and studied at Colorado College. She married her husband Charles Ulrick Bay, a businessman and Office of Strategic Services officer, in 1942. Charles would go on to become the United States ambassador to Norway before dying in 1955. At the time of his death, Charles held a 71% stake in A.M. Kidder & Co, a New York brokerage firm; in accordance with the rules of the New York Stock Exchange, this required Charles' beneficiary to either sell their shares or assume his former role in the firm. Rather than divest her stake, Josephine Bay chose to head the firm, and in 1956 became the president and chairman of A.M. Kidder & Co. In doing so, she became the first woman to lead a member firm of the NYSE. She would also serve as chairman of the board and chief executive officer of American Export Lines.

In 1959, she married Paul Michael Iogolevitch, a Russian émigré who had become a successful banker. She died in 1962.

The Josephine Bay Paul Center at the University of Chicago is named in her honor.

References 

1900 births
1962 deaths
American businesspeople